Johann Lonfat (born 11 September 1973) is a Swiss former professional footballer. A midfielder, he played in the centre or on the right.

Career
Lonfat was born in Martigny, Switzerland. During his career, Lonfat represented Martigny-Sports (1991–92 and 2009), FC Sion (1992–98), Servette FC (1998–2002 and 2007–09) and Sochaux (2002–2007, playing 96 Ligue 1 matches with one goal). A Swiss international, he received a total of 24 caps.

He was initially named in Switzerland's UEFA Euro 2004 squad but had to withdraw through injury and was replaced by Tranquillo Barnetta.

Honours
Sion
Swiss championship: 1996–97
Swiss Cup: 1994–95, 1995–96, 1996–97

Servette
Swiss championship: 1998–99
Swiss Cup: 2000–01

Sochaux
Coupe de la Ligue: 2003–04

References

External links

1973 births
Living people
Association football midfielders
Swiss men's footballers
Swiss Super League players
FC Martigny-Sports players
FC Sion players
Servette FC players
Ligue 1 players
FC Sochaux-Montbéliard players
Switzerland international footballers
People from Martigny
Swiss expatriate footballers
Expatriate footballers in France
Swiss expatriate sportspeople in France
Sportspeople from Valais